The Steel Fist is a 1952 American drama film directed by Wesley Barry and written by C.K. Kivari. The film stars Roddy McDowall, Kristine Miller, Harry Lauter, Rand Brooks, Byron Foulger and Kate Drain Lawson. The film was released on January 6, 1952 by Monogram Pictures.

Plot

An idealistic Soviet student goes on the run from the communist authorities with the help of the underground movement.

Cast          
 Roddy McDowall as Eric Kardin
 Kristine Miller as Marlina
 Harry Lauter as Franz
 Rand Brooks as Capt. Giorg Nicholoff
 Byron Foulger as Prof. Kardin
 Kate Drain Lawson as Mrs. Krechow
 Bob Peoples as First Lieutenant
 Gil Perkins as First organizer
 Fred Krone as First Student
 Murray Alper as Nicholas

References

External links
 
 
 
 

1952 films
American drama films
1952 drama films
Monogram Pictures films
American anti-communist propaganda films
American black-and-white films
Films directed by Wesley Barry
1950s English-language films
1950s American films